Michael Dana Butcher (born May 10, 1965) is an American professional baseball pitcher and coach. He served as the pitching coach for the Tampa Bay Rays in 2006, for the Angels from 2007 through 2015, and was previously the pitching coach for the Arizona Diamondbacks.

Career
Butcher graduated from United Township High School in East Moline, Illinois in 1983. attended Northeastern  Oklahoma A&M College in Miami, OK. He was drafted by the Cincinnati Reds in the 4th round of the 1986 Major League Baseball Draft, but did not sign. He signed with the Kansas City Royals after being drafted in the 2nd round of the 1986 June Secondary draft. Butcher was released by the Royals in 1988 and then signed as a free agent with the California Angels, with whom he made his Major League debut in 1992. Butcher played his final Major League game in 1995, although he pitched in the Seattle Mariners', Cleveland Indians' and Angels' organizations until 1998.

Butcher served as the pitching coach for the Tampa Bay Rays in 2006, and joined the Angels as their pitching coach in 2007. The Angels announced that Butcher would not be returning as the team pitching coach following the 2015 season. Prior to the 2016 season he was hired by the Arizona Diamondbacks to be their pitching coach.

References

External links

Official bio
Retrosheet

1965 births
Living people
American expatriate baseball players in Canada
Appleton Foxes players
Arizona Diamondbacks coaches
Baseball City Royals players
Baseball players from Iowa
Buffalo Bisons (minor league) players
California Angels players
Edmonton Trappers players
Eugene Emeralds players
Fort Myers Royals players
Major League Baseball pitchers
Major League Baseball pitching coaches
Los Angeles Angels of Anaheim coaches
Midland Angels players
Northeastern Oklahoma A&M Golden Norsemen baseball players
Palm Springs Angels players
Quad Cities Angels players
Sportspeople from Davenport, Iowa
Tacoma Rainiers players
Tampa Bay Devil Rays coaches
Vancouver Canadians players